Home Chef is a Chicago, Illinois-based meal kit and food delivery company that delivers pre-portioned ingredients and recipes to subscribers weekly in the United States. According to the company it delivers three million meals monthly to its subscribers.

On May 24, 2018, Kroger announced they were acquiring Home Chef for $200 million with an additional $500 million in incentives if certain targets were met by Home Chef. The acquisition closed during the end of June 2018 and the meal kits began to be stocked at Kroger stores in the middle of 2018.

Overview
Home Chef is a meal delivery service that provides a box of pre-portioned fresh ingredients directly to consumers that are ready to cook. With distribution centers in Chicago, Los Angeles, and Lithonia, Georgia, Home Chef delivers meals to all of the lower 48 states. Each meal kit comes with recyclable packaging, pre-portioned ingredients, and meal instructions. The rotating menu includes up to 15 meals for dinner, and the company also provides a weekly breakfast, lunch, smoothie and fruit basket option.

History
Founder and CEO, Patrick Vihtelic started Home Chef in June 2013. In September 2016, the company raised $40 million in funding from consumer-focused private equity fund L Catterton. In late 2017, Home Chef started selling their products through Walmart, in addition to its website.

The meal kits were available in select Kroger and Walgreens locations at the end of 2018.

In early 2019, Home Chef added a customization feature, where the user can swap the protein, double the amount of protein or upgrade to a higher grade of protein by using the website. 

In August 2019, Home Chef launched Fresh and Easy, another meal kit provider and food delivery service.

References

Further reading
 "Home Chef delivers meal kits to those who love to cook, hate to shop". Chicago Tribune.
 "Homemade goodness: Home Chef delivers recipes, ingredients to your doorstep". The Times of Northwest Indiana.
 
 "Are meal-kit delivery services worth the cost? We tried seven". St. Paul Pioneer Press.

External links
 

Kroger
Online food retailers of the United States
Subscription services
American companies established in 2013
Retail companies established in 2013
Transport companies established in 2013
Internet properties established in 2013
2018 mergers and acquisitions
Food and drink companies based in Chicago
2013 establishments in Illinois